Ophonichius is a genus of beetles in the family Carabidae, containing the following species:

 Ophonichius gerardi (Burgeon, 1935)
 Ophonichius giaquintoi (Straneo, 1949)
 Ophonichius gigas (Straneo, 1949)

References

Pterostichinae